Punjab College of Engineering & Technology (PCET) is an engineering institute located in Mohali Punjab. Established in 2002 this college is a part of Punjab Group of Colleges (PGC), Mohali under the aegis of Guru Nanak Dev Educational and Charitable Society (GNDECS), Lalru Mandi. PCET is affiliated to Punjab Technical University (PTU), Jallandhar and courses are approved by AICTE, New Delhi. The college is located 5 km off Ambala-Chandigarh Highway.

Apart from Punjab College of Engineering & Technology, other colleges under PGC are Punjab Institute of Engineering & Applied Research (PIEAR) affiliated to Punjab Technical University, Jalandhar and Punjab Polytechnic College (PPC) which offers Engineering Diploma courses and is affiliated to Punjab State Board of Technical Education.

Courses 

PCET offers the following courses at degree level through JEE (Main) and further counselling through PTU:
 BTech in Mechanical Engineering
 BTech in Electronics & Communications
 BTech in Electrical Engineering
 BTech in Computer Science
 BTech in CSE(Cyber Security) 
 BTech in Artificial Intelligence and Data Science(Al & DS)
 B.tech in CSE(Networks)
 B.tech in Electrical Engineering(Part-Time) 
 BSc(MLS)

Departments 

The institute has the following Departments/centres and Research areas for the candidates pursuing MTech and PhD:

Centre for Material Science &  Engg. :Spintronics, Magnetic multilayered Systems, Solar photovoltaic materials, sensors, CNTs
Computer Science & Engg.: Real- time system
Mechanical Engg.: Materials, Production/Industrial Engg., Manufacturing Technology, CAD-CAM
Electronics & Communication Engg.: Opto-electronic devices, nano-micro, electromechanical systems, (NEMS/MEMS), Control systems, FACTSDevices.

Nano-Research Laboratory:
The institute has a nano-research laboratory with Ref. 600 Potentiostat system, Keithley Source Meter, electrodeposition cell, Autoclave, and advanced software's etc. The lab is funded by DST Govt. of India, New Delhi and co-funded by Punjab College of Engg. & Technology.

Collaborations 
HCL K2 Academy:
PGC has an exclusive tie-up with HCL for training the latest technologies to the students. Under this programme HCL trainers provide 400 hours of training to students over 4 years on campus and on completion of training certification is provided. HCL will also assist in placement and Domestic/ International Industrial visits.
 
Siemens PLM Programme:
PGC has an exclusive Tie Up with GTT Pvt Ltd to provide Mechanical Engineering students 120 hours of on campus training from 3rd to 8th semester on PLM (Solid Edge CAD/CAM Technology) by multinational Siemens. During this period Fundamentals with Synchronous Technology, Assembly, Surfacing and Sheet Metal, Team Centre Express is covered along with Product Data Management.
Training is conducted by Siemens-trained Trainers and on successful completion certification for Siemens PLM software will be provided. Students will also be given a chance for placement drive based on this knowledge.

Cultural and technical festivals 
In 2014, the college decided to organise "Technotsav-2014" – a technical & cultural fest but it was cancelled as we were unable to pay the organisers. Besides this, the college organises an annual freshers' party with the name "Ashayein". Many new entrants show their talents and skills through this platform. Also, annual blood donation camps, athletic meets etc., are organised from time to time.

Life at campus 

Banking & ATM: An in-house Punjab & National Bank, Indian Overseas Bank, and State Bank of India are functioning from the Campus. The ATM of the Punjab and National Bank provides a clock ATM facility in the campus. This facility can be availed by the students and staff of the college. Upon enrolment, every student can open an account with the bank and can make full use of banking services, Internet Banking and A.T.M. facilities.

Cafeteria & food Court: The college cafeteria is open to students, staff and other visitors to the campus. The cafeteria serves fresh & hot meals.

Library: Libraries are fully automated with blue tooth scanners and Smart Card Readers so that students do not have to waste time on issues and return of books. PGC libraries have a collection of 35,000 volumes and subscribe to 200 periodicals. To encourage research activities and advanced reading, our libraries have memberships in many e-journals. This gives access to students to access articles, books, and reference material online. Apart from books it has a collection of Audio video material, CDs & DVDs. The library maintains a separate "Book Bank" collection exclusively for meritorious students.

Smart Campus: Punjab Group of Colleges have implemented Enterprise Resource Planning (ERP) system called "Smart Campus".

Engineering colleges in Punjab, India
Education in Mohali
Educational institutions established in 2002
2002 establishments in Punjab, India